The 7th constituency of the Bas-Rhin is a French legislative constituency in the Bas-Rhin département.

Description

Bas-Rhin's 7th Constituency covers the north western portion of Bas Rhin and includes all of the Arrondissement of Saverne as well as Hochfelden from the Arrondissement of Strasbourg-Campagne. It also includes the southern portion of the Northern Vosges Regional Natural Park.

Like much of Alsace the constituency has returned conservative members to the National Assembly throughout the Fifth Republic.

Historic representation

Election results

2022

 
 
|-
| colspan="8" bgcolor="#E9E9E9"|
|-

2017

|- style="background-color:#E9E9E9;text-align:center;"
! colspan="2" rowspan="2" style="text-align:left;" | Candidate
! rowspan="2" colspan="2" style="text-align:left;" | Party
! colspan="2" | 1st round
! colspan="2" | 2nd round
|- style="background-color:#E9E9E9;text-align:center;"
! width="75" | Votes
! width="30" | %
! width="75" | Votes
! width="30" | %
|-
| style="background-color:" |
| style="text-align:left;" | Partick Hetzel
| style="text-align:left;" | The Republicans
| LR
| 
| 33.77
| 
| 62.61
|-
| style="background-color:" |
| style="text-align:left;" | Antoinette De Santis
| style="text-align:left;" | La République En Marche!
| LREM
| 
| 26.70
| 
| 37.39
|-
| style="background-color:" |
| style="text-align:left;" | Virginie Joron
| style="text-align:left;" | National Front
| FN
| 
| 15.75
| colspan="2" style="text-align:left;" |
|-
| style="background-color:" |
| style="text-align:left;" | Jean-Marie Lorber
| style="text-align:left;" | Regionalist
| REG
| 
| 8.55
| colspan="2" style="text-align:left;" |
|-
| style="background-color:" |
| style="text-align:left;" | Peter Andersen
| style="text-align:left;" | La France Insoumise
| FI
| 
| 5.61
| colspan="2" style="text-align:left;" |
|-
| style="background-color:" |
| style="text-align:left;" | Sandrine Lombard
| style="text-align:left;" | Ecologist
| ECO
| 
| 4.37
| colspan="2" style="text-align:left;" |
|-
| style="background-color:" |
| style="text-align:left;" | Pascale Elles
| style="text-align:left;" | Debout la France
| DLF
| 
| 1.19
| colspan="2" style="text-align:left;" |
|-
| style="background-color:" |
| style="text-align:left;" | Bénédicte Herrgott
| style="text-align:left;" | Communist Party
| PCF
| 
| 1.09
| colspan="2" style="text-align:left;" |
|-
| style="background-color:" |
| style="text-align:left;" | Natacha Ruiz
| style="text-align:left;" | Ecologist
| ECO
| 
| 1.00
| colspan="2" style="text-align:left;" |
|-
| style="background-color:" |
| style="text-align:left;" | Aurélien Hary
| style="text-align:left;" | Independent
| DIV
| 
| 0.64
| colspan="2" style="text-align:left;" |
|-
| style="background-color:" |
| style="text-align:left;" | Olivier Muller-Haenel
| style="text-align:left;" | Independent
| DIV
| 
| 0.58
| colspan="2" style="text-align:left;" |
|-
| style="background-color:" |
| style="text-align:left;" | Jeanne-Françoise Langlade
| style="text-align:left;" | Far Left
| EXG
| 
| 0.51
| colspan="2" style="text-align:left;" |
|-
| style="background-color:" |
| style="text-align:left;" | Mikaïl Kaya
| style="text-align:left;" | Independent
| DIV
| 
| 0.25
| colspan="2" style="text-align:left;" |
|-
| colspan="8" style="background-color:#E9E9E9;"|
|- style="font-weight:bold"
| colspan="4" style="text-align:left;" | Total
| 
| 100%
| 
| 100%
|-
| colspan="8" style="background-color:#E9E9E9;"|
|-
| colspan="4" style="text-align:left;" | Registered voters
| 
| style="background-color:#E9E9E9;"|
| 
| style="background-color:#E9E9E9;"|
|-
| colspan="4" style="text-align:left;" | Blank/Void ballots
| 
| 2.00%
| 
| 6.84%
|-
| colspan="4" style="text-align:left;" | Turnout
| 
| 47.56%
| 
| 41.82%
|-
| colspan="4" style="text-align:left;" | Abstentions
| 
| 52.44%
| 
| 58.18%
|-
| colspan="8" style="background-color:#E9E9E9;"|
|- style="font-weight:bold"
| colspan="6" style="text-align:left;" | Result
| colspan="2" style="background-color:" | LR GAIN FROM UMP
|}

2012

|- style="background-color:#E9E9E9;text-align:center;"
! colspan="2" rowspan="2" style="text-align:left;" | Candidate
! rowspan="2" colspan="2" style="text-align:left;" | Party
! colspan="2" | 1st round
! colspan="2" | 2nd round
|- style="background-color:#E9E9E9;text-align:center;"
! width="75" | Votes
! width="30" | %
! width="75" | Votes
! width="30" | %
|-
| style="background-color:" |
| style="text-align:left;" | Patrick Hetzel
| style="text-align:left;" | Union for a Popular Movement
| UMP
| 
| 31.43
| 
| 57.31
|-
| style="background-color:" |
| style="text-align:left;" | Thierry Carbiener
| style="text-align:left;" | Centrist Alliance
| AC
| 
| 20.51
| 
| 42.79
|-
| style="background-color:" |
| style="text-align:left;" | Laurent Gnaedig
| style="text-align:left;" | National Front
| FN
| 
| 18.64
| colspan="2" style="text-align:left;" |
|-
| style="background-color:" |
| style="text-align:left;" | Michèle Comte
| style="text-align:left;" | Europe Ecology - The Greens
| EELV
| 
| 12.26
| colspan="2" style="text-align:left;" |
|-
| style="background-color:" |
| style="text-align:left;" | Denis Lieb
| style="text-align:left;" | Regionalist
| REG
| 
| 9.65
| colspan="2" style="text-align:left;" |
|-
| style="background-color:" |
| style="text-align:left;" | Bénédicte Herrgott
| style="text-align:left;" | Left Front
| FG
| 
| 3.87
| colspan="2" style="text-align:left;" |
|-
| style="background-color:" |
| style="text-align:left;" | Pierre Schweitzer
| style="text-align:left;" | The Centre for France
| CEN
| 
| 1.89
| colspan="2" style="text-align:left;" |
|-
| style="background-color:" |
| style="text-align:left;" | Anne-Marie Victor
| style="text-align:left;" | Other
| AUT
| 
| 0.82
| colspan="2" style="text-align:left;" |
|-
| style="background-color:" |
| style="text-align:left;" | Liliane Bas
| style="text-align:left;" | Far Left
| EXG
| 
| 0.57
| colspan="2" style="text-align:left;" |
|-
| style="background-color:" |
| style="text-align:left;" | Etienne Schmitt
| style="text-align:left;" | Other
| AUT
| 
| 0.36
| colspan="2" style="text-align:left;" |
|-
| colspan="8" style="background-color:#E9E9E9;"|
|- style="font-weight:bold"
| colspan="4" style="text-align:left;" | Total
| 
| 100%
| 
| 100%
|-
| colspan="8" style="background-color:#E9E9E9;"|
|-
| colspan="4" style="text-align:left;" | Registered voters
| 
| style="background-color:#E9E9E9;"|
| 
| style="background-color:#E9E9E9;"|
|-
| colspan="4" style="text-align:left;" | Blank/Void ballots
| 
| 1.79%
| 
| 7.46%
|-
| colspan="4" style="text-align:left;" | Turnout
| 
| 55.55%
| 
| %
|-
| colspan="4" style="text-align:left;" | Abstentions
| 
| 44.45%
| 
| 52.19%
|-
| colspan="8" style="background-color:#E9E9E9;"|
|- style="font-weight:bold"
| colspan="6" style="text-align:left;" | Result
| colspan="2" style="background-color:" | UMP HOLD
|}

2007
Emile Blessig was elected with more than 50% of the vote in the first round of voting, and therefore no second round took place.

|- style="background-color:#E9E9E9;text-align:center;"
! colspan="2" rowspan="2" style="text-align:left;" | Candidate
! rowspan="2" colspan="2" style="text-align:left;" | Party
! colspan="2" | 1st round
|- style="background-color:#E9E9E9;text-align:center;"
! width="75" | Votes
! width="30" | %
|-
| style="background-color:" |
| style="text-align:left;" | Emile Blessig
| style="text-align:left;" | Union for a Popular Movement
| UMP
| 
| 60.49
|-
| style="background-color:" |
| style="text-align:left;" | Thierry Carbiener
| style="text-align:left;" | UDF-Democratic Movement
| UDF-MoDem
| 
| 14.62
|-
| style="background-color:" |
| style="text-align:left;" | Pascale Delorme
| style="text-align:left;" | Socialist Party
| PS
| 
| 6.54
|-
| style="background-color:" |
| style="text-align:left;" | Robert Martig
| style="text-align:left;" | National Front
| FN
| 
| 6.52
|-
| style="background-color:" |
| style="text-align:left;" | Marie Madeline Braud
| style="text-align:left;" | The Greens
| LV
| 
| 4.82
|-
| style="background-color:" |
| style="text-align:left;" | Fabienne Schnitzler
| style="text-align:left;" | Ecologist
| ECO
| 
| 1.64
|-
| style="background-color:" |
| style="text-align:left;" | Liliane Bas
| style="text-align:left;" | Far Left
| EXG
| 
| 1.50
|-
| style="background-color:" |
| style="text-align:left;" | Hervé Therouse
| style="text-align:left;" | Miscellaneous Left
| DVG
| 
| 1.17
|-
| style="background-color:" |
| style="text-align:left;" | Georges Hoffmann
| style="text-align:left;" | Far Left
| EXG
| 
| 1.04
|-
| style="background-color:" |
| style="text-align:left;" | Yves Queneville
| style="text-align:left;" | Independent
| DIV
| 
| 0.94
|-
| style="background-color:" |
| style="text-align:left;" | Evelyne Hamm
| style="text-align:left;" | Far Right
| EXD
| 
| 0.71
|-
| colspan="6" style="background-color:#E9E9E9;"|
|- style="font-weight:bold"
| colspan="4" style="text-align:left;" | Total
| 
| 100%
|-
| colspan="6" style="background-color:#E9E9E9;"|
|-
| colspan="4" style="text-align:left;" | Registered voters
| 
| style="background-color:#E9E9E9;"|
|-
| colspan="4" style="text-align:left;" | Blank/Void ballots
| 
| 2.45%
|-
| colspan="4" style="text-align:left;" | Turnout
| 
| 55.79%
|-
| colspan="4" style="text-align:left;" | Abstentions
| 
| %
|-
| colspan="6" style="background-color:#E9E9E9;"|
|- style="font-weight:bold"
| colspan="4" style="text-align:left;" | Result
| colspan="2" style="background-color:" | UMP GAIN
|}

2002
Emile Blessig was elected with more than 50% of the vote in the first round of voting, and therefore no second round took place.

|- style="background-color:#E9E9E9;text-align:center;"
! colspan="2" rowspan="2" style="text-align:left;" | Candidate
! rowspan="2" colspan="2" style="text-align:left;" | Party
! colspan="2" | 1st round
|- style="background-color:#E9E9E9;text-align:center;"
! width="75" | Votes
! width="30" | %
|-
| style="background-color:" |
| style="text-align:left;" | Emile Blessig
| style="text-align:left;" | Union for French Democracy
| UDF
| 
| 54.55
|-
| style="background-color:" |
| style="text-align:left;" | Nicolas Olszak
| style="text-align:left;" | Socialist Party
| PS
| 
| 15.86
|-
| style="background-color:" |
| style="text-align:left;" | Antoine Kraemer
| style="text-align:left;" | National Front
| FN
| 
| 12.84
|-
| style="background-color:" |
| style="text-align:left;" | Rene Weess
| style="text-align:left;" | National Republican Movement
| MNR
| 
| 7.30
|-
| style="background-color:" |
| style="text-align:left;" | Mathieu Fichter
| style="text-align:left;" | The Greens
| LV
| 
| 3.11
|-
| style="background-color:" |
| style="text-align:left;" | A. Marie Traore
| style="text-align:left;" | Workers’ Struggle
| LO
| 
| 1.23
|-
| style="background-color:" |
| style="text-align:left;" | Maryse Retali
| style="text-align:left;" | Ecologist
| ECO
| 
| 1.17
|-
| style="background-color:" |
| style="text-align:left;" | Sylvie Lohr
| style="text-align:left;" | Revolutionary Communist League
| LCR
| 
| 1.13
|-
| style="background-color:" |
| style="text-align:left;" | Robert Hoppe
| style="text-align:left;" | Ecologist
| ECO
| 
| 0.98
|-
| style="background-color:" |
| style="text-align:left;" | Jacky Dudt
| style="text-align:left;" | Communist Party
| PCF
| 
| 0.94
|-
| style="background-color:" |
| style="text-align:left;" | Pascal Dupaix
| style="text-align:left;" | Miscellaneous Right
| DVD
| 
| 0.89
|-
| colspan="6" style="background-color:#E9E9E9;"|
|- style="font-weight:bold"
| colspan="4" style="text-align:left;" | Total
| 
| 100%
|-
| colspan="6" style="background-color:#E9E9E9;"|
|-
| colspan="4" style="text-align:left;" | Registered voters
| 
| style="background-color:#E9E9E9;"|
|-
| colspan="4" style="text-align:left;" | Blank/Void ballots
| 
| 2.68%
|-
| colspan="4" style="text-align:left;" | Turnout
| 
| 58.94%
|-
| colspan="4" style="text-align:left;" | Abstentions
| 
| 41.06%
|-
| colspan="6" style="background-color:#E9E9E9;"|
|- style="font-weight:bold"
| colspan="4" style="text-align:left;" | Result
| colspan="2" style="background-color:" | UDF GAIN
|}

Sources

7